Contra-Kreis-Theater  is a theatre in Bonn, North Rhine-Westphalia, Germany.

Theatres in Bonn